Elections to the Legislative Council for the State of Aden were held on 16 October 1964.

Background
The elections had originally been scheduled for 1962 but after being postponed, they took place amid widespread unrest; political detentions were common and public meetings were banned. The major political parties, including the People's Socialist Party (PSP), all boycotted the elections.

A total of 48 candidates contested the 16 elected seats.

Results
Despite the boycott, voter turnout was 76%. A man imprisoned in the 1963 airport grenade attack against the British delegation received 98% of the vote in Crater, and 14 of the other 16 elected council members successfully demanded that he be released from prison and seated on the council. Zain Baharoon initially continued as Chief Minister, but was replaced by the PSP's Abdulqawi Makkawi in March 1965.

References

Aden
Elections in Yemen
20th century in the Colony of Aden
1964 in the Federation of South Arabia
1964 in the British Empire
Election and referendum articles with incomplete results
October 1964 events in Asia